Rebel Eats is an American television pilot that aired on Food Network in 2013. The show was hosted and executive produced by Justin Warner.

References

2013 in American television
2013 television specials
2010s American cooking television series
2010s American television specials
Food Network television specials
Television pilots not picked up as a series